Marcel Huguenin (1 July 1930 – 31 March 2020) was a Swiss cross-country skier. He competed at the 1956 Winter Olympics and the 1960 Winter Olympics.

References

External links
 

1930 births
2020 deaths
Swiss male cross-country skiers
Olympic cross-country skiers of Switzerland
Cross-country skiers at the 1956 Winter Olympics
Cross-country skiers at the 1960 Winter Olympics
Sportspeople from the canton of Neuchâtel
20th-century Swiss people